Kimmo Hovi (born 31 May 1994) is a Finnish professional footballer who plays as a forward for German Regionalliga club VfB Lübeck. He has also represented Finland U21 national team. He began his senior club career playing for PKKU at age 16 in 2012, before signing with FC Lahti in 2014. During his debut season he helped FC Lahti win bronze in the Veikkausliiga. Since then he has represented various clubs from Finland, Germany, Malta and Spain.

Club career

PKKU

Hovi was born in Mäntsälä, Finland. He transferred to PKKU in 2010 and made his debut in Kakkonen during season 2012. Season 2013 was his break through when he scored 17 goals in 21 matches. After the season, he was loaned to Maltese Melita F.C.

FC Lahti

For the season 2014 he joined FC Lahti. During his first season on league level he made 11 appearances and scored one goal. He was also loaned for four matches to FC Kuusysi.

Real Avilés

In January 2015 it was announced that Hovi would join Spanish Real Avilés. He did not gain any appearances in the team and was loaned to Mérida AD.

Portugalete

For season 2015–16 Hovi played for Spanish Segunda División B club Portugalete.

Inter Leipzig

In August 2016 it was announced that Hovi would join German team Inter Leipzig.

Chemnitzer

After two successful seasons in Leipzig he was picked by Chemnitzer FC.

Union Fürstenwalde

Unsatisfied with his playtime in Chemnitzer he joined Union Fürstenwalde on 16 January 2019.

Viktoria Berlin

On 11 May 2020, Hovi joined Regionalliga Nordost club Viktoria Berlin, signing a two-year deal.

Lübeck

After two seasons in Berlin Hovi signed a deal with Lübeck.

International career

Hovi made his debut in international football on 23 March 2013 at the age 18  in a match between Finland U19 and Austria U19. 

Hovi made his debut for the Finland U21 national team and his only goal on 9 September 2014 in a 5–0 away victory UEFA European Under-21 Championship qualification match against San Marino. He gained his second cap in the UEFA European U-21 Championship qualifications in Arto Tolsa Areena, Kotka on 4 September 2015 in a match against Russia.

Career statistics

Club

Honours
Viktoria Berlin
Regionalliga Nordost: 2020–21

References

External links 

 FC Viktoria 1889 Berlin official profile
 Kimmo Hovi – SPL competition record 
 
 
 
 

1994 births
Living people
Finnish footballers
Association football forwards
Veikkausliiga players
Segunda División B players
Kakkonen players
Regionalliga players
3. Liga players
FC Lahti players
Pallokerho Keski-Uusimaa players
Tercera División players
Real Avilés CF footballers
Mérida AD players
Club Portugalete players
Inter Leipzig players
Chemnitzer FC players
FSV Union Fürstenwalde players
FC Viktoria 1889 Berlin players
VfB Lübeck players
Finnish expatriate footballers
Finnish expatriate sportspeople in Malta
Expatriate footballers in Malta
Finnish expatriate sportspeople in Spain
Expatriate footballers in Spain
Finnish expatriate sportspeople in Germany
Expatriate footballers in Germany
People from Mäntsälä
Sportspeople from Uusimaa